Karkikhan (also Romanized as Karkīkhān and Karkīn Khān) is a village in Gudarzi Rural District, Oshtorinan District, Borujerd County, Lorestan Province, Iran. At the 2006 census, its population was 1,713, in 440 families.

References 

Towns and villages in Borujerd County